The Batesville School District is a public school district in Independence County, Arkansas, United States, based in Batesville, Arkansas.

History
Desha School District consolidated into Batesville School District on July 1, 1985. Sulphur Rock School District consolidated into Batesville School District on July 1, 2005. Cushman School District consolidated into Batesville School District on July 1, 2009.

By 2020 the district decreased expenses by switching to solar power, allowing it to raise teacher salaries. The solar panels were funded by a bond initiative.

Schools
The Batesville School District has one early learning center, one junior high school, one high school and four magnet schools.

Early learning center
Early Learning & Enrichment Center

Junior high school
Batesville Junior High School

High school
Batesville High School
White River Academy - Alternative Learning Environment, Grades 7-12

Magnet schools
Sulphur Rock Math & Science Magnet School
West Visual & Performing Arts Magnet School 
Eagle Mountain Magnet Health & International School

References

Further reading
  - Video
These include maps of predecessor districts:
 (Download)

External links

School districts in Arkansas
Education in Independence County, Arkansas